E.Latunde Odeku (born, Emanuel Olatunde Alaba Olanrewaju Odeku, 1927, Lagos, Nigeria – died, London, 1974) was the first Nigerian neurosurgeon trained in the United States who also pioneered neurosurgery in Africa.

Early life and education
Of Yoruba heritage, Latunde  was born in Lagos, Nigeria.  His father was a native of Awe while his mother was a Lagosian. He attended Methodist Boys High School, Lagos. and proceeded to Howard University and graduated summa cum laude in Zoology in 1950. He was subsequently awarded a scholarship to study Medicine at Howard University, earning his MD in 1954.

Medical career
After passing the Licencuate Medical exam of Canada, Latunde spent the following year in Nigeria as a medical officer at the Lagos General Hospital. In 1961, he returned to the United States and was offered a residency position, training under Dr. Kahn (from 1956 to 1960) at the University of Michigan. Afterwards, he trained in Neurology under Dr. Webb Haymaker at the Walter Reed Medical Center in Washington, D.C . He subsequently underwent another pediatric neurosurgery residency at the Children’s Hospital of Philadelphia under Dr. Eugene Spitz, creator of the Spitz-Holter valve for treating hydrocephalus. In 1961, he was  appointed Instructor of Neuroanatomy and Neurosurgery at the College of Medicine, Howard University.

Although Latunde was subsequently offered multiple appointments including two distinguished academic neurosurgery faculty positions in the United States; however, he chose to return to Nigeria. Latunde came to the University of Ibadan in 1962 as the first neurosurgeon of West  Africa. In 1962, he was appointed as senior faculty and became a fellow of the American College of Surgeons. In 1965, he was appointed as a Professor of Neurosurgery; from 1968 to 1971, serving as the head of the Department of Surgery and the Dean of the University of Ibadan College of Medicine. He also established the National and West  African Postgraduate Medical Colleges and the initiation processes at the University of Ibadan College of Medicine, presently performed in all Nigerian medical schools.

Latunde was also a poet and writer: He made significant contributions to the neurosurgical literature, publishing 61 scientific articles over a period of about 12 years.

Latunde was awarded the Howard University alumni award for a distinguished service.

Personal life
Latunde was married twice both times to medical doctors. His first marriage was blessed with two children before they got divorced. In 1971 he married the then Katherine Jill Adcock, an English medical doctor who was working at the University College Hospital. Their marriage was blessed with two children - Alan, who was born in October 1971 and a daughter born in January 1973.

In his lifetime, despite being a busy medical practitioner, Latunde solely and jointly published 85 medically related articles and 13 other articles related to general topics. As an accomplished physician-poet, he authored two collections of poetry: Twilight: Out of the Night (1964), and Whispers from the Night (1969).

Later years
From 1972, his health began to fail from complications of Diabetes. He died on August 20, 1974 at Hammersmith Hospital,  London and was laid to rest at St Peter's Church, Burnham, England.

Published works 

 Twilight of the Night 
 Odeku, E. Latunde. (1978). Publications of E. Latunde  
 E. Latunde Odeku (1975) 
 Whispers from the night (1969) 
 Odeku, E. L., & Adeloye, A. (1978). Publications of E. Latunde Odeku. Ibadan, Nigeria: University of Ibadan.
 Beginnings of Neurosurgery at the University of Ibadan, Nigeria 
 Congenital Subgaleal Cysts over the Anterior Fontanelle in Nigerians 
Adeloye, Adelola Odeku, E. Latunde (1971-02). Congenital Subgaleal Cysts over the Anterior Fontanelle in Nigerians 
Adeloye, A.; Odeku, E. L. (1971-02-01) Epilepsy after missile wounds of the head 
Epilepsy after missile wounds of the head (Book) 
Perspectives in Neurosurgery  (1971-01-01)  
Adeloye, Adelola; Latunde Odeku, E. (1971). "The radiology of missile head wounds". Clinical Radiology. 22 (3): 312–320. doi:10.1016/s0009-9260(71)80079-x. ISSN 0009-9260.
Biography - E. Latunde Odeku, an African neurosurgeon (1976) 
Three decades of medical research at the College of Medicine, Ibadan, Nigeria 1948 - 1980 ; a list of the papers publ. by members of the College of Med. of the Univ. of Ibadan from its foundation through 1980 
E. Latunde Odeku, M.D., F.A.C.S., F.I.C.S., 1927-1974. An African pioneer neurosurgeon.
Letter E. Latunde Odeku  
Obituary: Professor E. Latunde Odeku B.Sc., M.D., L.M.C.C. (Canada), D.A.B.N.S., F.I.C.S., F.A.C.S., F.M.C.S. (Nigeria) by A Adeloye Publication: Surgical neurology, 1975 Apr; 3(4): 187
11th E. Latunde Odeku memorial lecture given on 27 October 1987.

References

Physicians from Lagos
Yoruba physicians
Yoruba academics
1927 births
1974 deaths
Nigerian neurosurgeons
Howard University College of Medicine alumni
University of Michigan faculty
Academic staff of the University of Ibadan
Nigerian expatriates in the United States
20th-century Nigerian medical doctors
Methodist Boys' High School alumni
Deaths from diabetes
Howard University faculty
Burials in Buckinghamshire
20th-century surgeons